Frank Fontaine (April 19, 1920 – August 4, 1978) was an American stage, radio, film and television comedian, singer and actor.

Early years and personal life
Born and raised in Cambridge, Massachusetts, Fontaine came from a family of entertainers. His father, Ray Fontaine, of French-Canadian descent, was a popular vocalist whose career in Canada resulted in his being compared to Bing Crosby. His mother, Anna McCarthy, of Irish and Scottish descent, performed as a dancer, and he had a brother who also became a singer. Fontaine left school and married at age sixteen. Two days before his 17th birthday, he married his childhood sweetheart, Alma Clair Wakeham, and moved to Medford. He went right to work as an all‐purpose singer‐dancer‐comedian in Boston area supper clubs. After Pearl Harbor, he spent three years in the Army.

He had a reputation as a family man, known for being devoted to his wife and children. He would rearrange his schedule so that he was never away from them for too long. In addition, he was well known for the size of his family: he and his wife Alma had two daughters and nine sons.

Career

Fontaine is best known for his appearances on television shows of the 1950s and 1960s, including The Jack Benny Program, The Jackie Gleason Show, The Tonight Show, and The Ed Sullivan Show. One of his earliest appearances was on the radio version of The Jack Benny Program. During an episode which aired on April 9, 1950, Fontaine played a bum (named "John L.C. Sivoney") who asked Benny for a dime for a cup of coffee. The smallest coin Benny had to offer was a fifty-cent piece, so he gave it to him. The story Benny told about this event became a running gag during later shows. Fontaine's goofball laugh and other voice mannerisms made a hit with the audience, and Benny brought him back for several more radio shows between 1950-52. He also later appeared on four of Jack Benny's television shows between 1951 and 1961. In 1952, Fontaine starred in The Frank Fontaine Show, a weekly variety program on CBS radio. The program featured four other members of Fontaine's family in addition to singer Helen O'Connell and announcer Harry von Zell. He also was heard regularly on The Bob Hope Show on radio. On June 3, 1955, his comedy-variety television program, Frank Fontaine's Showtime, debuted on KTTV in Los Angeles.

On The Jackie Gleason Show, he played the always-inebriated character "Crazy Guggenheim" during Gleason's "Joe the Bartender" skits. His trademark was a bug-eyed grin and the same silly laugh he had done on Jack Benny's radio show. At the end of his Guggenheim sketch, he would usually sing a song, demonstrating a surprisingly strong baritone voice.

In 1963, he released an album Songs I Sing on The Jackie Gleason Show, with a collection of some of those songs, which reached number one on Billboard magazine's Top LP's chart in 1963. He also was the voice of Rocky the Rhino in Walt Disney's The Jungle Book until Disney cut the creature from the picture. Fontaine was a lifelong non-drinker in his private life.

Actor Lennie Weinrib imitated the "Crazy Guggenheim" character on The Dick Van Dyke Show episode "The Sam Pomerantz Scandals".

Legacy
Stan Freberg's voice characterization for Pete Puma, a would-be nemesis for Bugs Bunny in the 1952 cartoon short Rabbit's Kin, was based on Fontaine's character voice, along with Daws Butler's voice for Sam the Cat in the Sylvester cartoons Trick or Tweet in 1958 and Mouse and Garden in 1960 and Barney Gumble from The Simpsons. Muppet performer Jerry Nelson based the voice of one of his characters, Lew Zealand, off of Fontaine's "Crazy Guggenheim" voice.

Fontaine received mention in satirist Tom Lehrer's 1965 song "National Brotherhood Week", from the album That Was the Year That Was. In the live show, Lehrer mentioned National Make-Fun-of-the-Handicapped Week, "Which Frank Fontaine and Jerry Lewis are in charge of, as you know". He was credited in Bobby Rydell and Chubby Checker's song "Jingle Bells Imitations", which was the flipside of their Jingle Bell Rock record.

Death
Fontaine died of a heart attack on August 4, 1978 in Spokane, Washington. He had just completed a live stage benefit show, having accepted a check for $25,000 which he planned to donate for heart research, when he collapsed and died.

He was interred at Oak Grove Cemetery in Medford, Massachusetts, near his last residence in Winchester, Massachusetts, a substantial house on Highland Avenue, now the home of Winchester Community Music School.

Filmography

References

External links
 Jerry Haendiges Vintage Radio Logs: The Jack Benny Show
 
 
 Information about Rocky the Rhino from "The Jungle Book" (1967)

1920 births
1978 deaths
20th-century American male actors
American male comedians
United States Army personnel of World War II
Male actors from Boston
Musicians from Boston
20th-century American musicians
20th-century American comedians